"Tis the Damn Season" (stylized in all lowercase) is a song by American singer-songwriter Taylor Swift, taken from her ninth studio album, Evermore (2020). Written and produced by Swift and Aaron Dessner, Tis the Damn Season" is a folk song instrumented by a finger-picked electric guitar and programmed drums. Narrated from the perspective of a female character named Dorothea, the lyrics detail her returning to her hometown in Tupelo, Mississippi, where she encounters her former lover, knowing the rekindled relationship will inevitably end. Tis the Damn Season" is a counterpart to fellow track "Dorothea", which gives the former lover's point of view, addressed to the titular character.

Upon the release of Evermore, Tis the Damn Season" was extolled by music critics, who admired its nostalgia-inducing lyrics and twist on holiday music. In the United States, it debuted at number 39 on the Billboard Hot 100, number six on the Billboard Hot Rock & Alternative Songs chart, and number 13 on the Rolling Stone Top 100. Internationally, it charted at numbers 13, 23 and 24 on the Canadian Hot 100, the Billboard Global 200, and the Australian Singles Chart, respectively.

Background and release 
On July 24, 2020, during the COVID-19 lockdowns, Swift surprise-released her eighth studio album, Folklore, to widespread critical acclaim and commercial success. In September 2020, Swift and her co-producers and co-writers for the album, Aaron Dessner and Jack Antonoff, assembled at Long Pond Studio, located in a secluded cabin in upstate New York, to film the documentary Folklore: The Long Pond Studio Sessions. Released to Disney+ and accompanied by a live album released digitally, Swift performed the stripped-down renditions of all 17 tracks on Folklore and recounted the creative process of developing the album. After the filming process, Swift, Antonoff, and Dessner celebrated Folklore by drinking and ultimately decided to stay in Long Pond and unexpectedly continued writing songs. Swift wrote Tis the Damn Season" in the middle of the night while drunk on the first day of rehearsal. The next day, at approximately 9:00 a.m., she presented the lyrics to Dessner, who recounted the moment in an interview with Billboard: "That was definitely another moment [where] my brain exploded, because she sang it to me in my kitchen, and it was just surreal." Dessner wrote the music to Tis the Damn Season" several years before Evermore and described it as one of his favorite works ever. He compared the background and writing of the song to that of "Peace" from Folklore and recounted that the song could have remained instrumental but "someone of [Swift's] incredible storytelling ability and musical ability took it and made something much greater."

Before the release of Evermore, Swift teased the song Tis the Damn Season" on December 9, 2020, in an Instagram story in which she posted a photo of herself from an Entertainment Weekly feature with the caption "This outfit really screams 'TIS THE DAMN SEASON." On December 10, 2020, Swift announced that her ninth studio album and Folklores sister album, Evermore, would come out at midnight and revealed its track listing, where Tis the Damn Season" placed fourth. In the announcement, Swift teased imageries of various tracks, including Tis the Damn Season", which is narrated by a character named Dorothea who left her hometown of Tupelo, Mississippi for Hollywood. When she comes back for the holidays, she rediscovers an old romantic relationship with an unnamed lover to whom the song is addressed to, knowing it will inevitably fade again. "Dorothea", the eighth track on the album, is written from the unnamed narrator's perspective. Lyric videos of each song on the album were released to Swift's YouTube channel; Tis the Damn Season" has since garnered over 10 million views as of October 2022.

Composition and lyrics
Tis the Damn Season" is a minimalistic, nostalgic, folk song that spins a twist on traditional Christmas balladry. The song is set in the key of F major with a moderately fast tempo of 146 beats per minute. Swift's vocals span from C3 to A4. Tis the Damn Season" is built on an "icy", swirling finger-picked electric guitar and minimalistic drum programming. Dessner performed the acoustic guitar, bass, drums, electric guitar, and piano for the song; also instrumenting the song were a cello, harmonium, keyboard, trombone, and violin.

Lyrically, it is written from the perspective of a woman named Dorothea, a Hollywood actress who returns to her hometown of Tupelo, Mississippi to visit her family for Thanksgiving weekend. Dorothea encounters an unnamed former lover and ends up reluctantly engaging in a "fleeting but intimate" relationship with somebody from her youth and ending up in bed together, despite knowing she will inevitably have to abandon their relationship again. Similar to "Cardigan", "August", and "Betty" on Folklore, the song is part of a series of songs written from different perspectives of the same romantic relationship; "Dorothea", the eighth track on Evermore, is written from the perspective of the unnamed narrator, who is more optimistic towards the possibility of dating Dorothea once again. Dorothea painfully reminisces her luxurious life in Los Angeles, loathing her star-studded career in favor of the comfort of her hometown and the unnamed addressee: "So I'll go back to L.A. and the so-called friends / Who'll write books about me if I ever make it / And wonder about the only soul / Who can tell which smiles I'm fakin'".

Critical reception 
Tis the Damn Season" received widespread critical acclaim for its "rather moving" variation on traditional, more upbeat holiday music. In a review published in Rolling Stone, Brittany Spanos described the song as a "nostalgic gut-punch" and "tautly [capturing] the eerily specific nostalgia and the familiarly messy unraveling that is bound to accompany it." Spanos praised its "lyrical flourishes" and more awkward, less idealistic narrative that distinguish it from traditional Christmas songs. In a review of Evermore, Claire Shaffer, also of Rolling Stone praised the storyline detailed from different sides of the story in Tis the Damn Season" and "Dorothea". Robert Christgau considered the song a future Christmas classic, and Carl Wilson similarly lauded it as Swift's "great Christmas song".

Sam Sodomsky of Pitchfork praised Swift's use of her "wordy" and detailed lyricism: "she treats Dessner's electric guitar framework as an empty diary page, her notes spilling into the margins, using every inch of space he offers to describe the fog on the windshield, the mud on the tires, the parking spot by her old school." Brodie Lancaster of The Sydney Morning Herald described the song as powerful, highlighting the "references to suburban nostalgia" that reveal the comfort Swift takes in her hometown, despite being a world-famous celebrity. Madeline Crone of American Songwriter depicted the storyline in Tis the Damn Season" as "the all-too-familiar night before Thanksgiving narrative". Mary Siroky from Consequence praised the turns of phrase and picked the track as one of Evermore's essentials.

Maura Johnston of Entertainment Weekly chose Tis the Damn Season" as a "luminous" example of Evermores elevated songwriting and production. In NPR, Stephen Thompson lauded the guitar line as "absolutely devastating" and the songwriting as a "master class" displaying Swift's talents. Annie Zaleski of The A.V. Club opined that Tis the Damn Season" was an example of Evermores sonic cohesion and wintery songwriting, and Patrick Ryan of USA Today identified the track as a hallmark of Evermores "escapist fantasy" that slips between various narratives and perspectives. Insider critics lauded the song's "thicker" production and Swift's nuanced vocals. Callie Ahlgrim said the song is "littered with wistful what-ifs, holiday-season reminiscence, and hometown yearnings." In a review of Evermore, Jason Lipshutz of Billboard chose Tis the Damn Season" as an example of how "smartly paced" Evermore is, "offering hope and longevity in the midst of the wreckage." Lipshutz ranked the song as the 7th best track on the album, applauding the "sparkl[ing]" lyrical detail and describing it as a song that could fit on Speak Now or Red but with "wiser" storytelling and production.

Commercial performance 
Following the release of Evermore, on the issue dated December 26, 2020, Tis the Damn Season" debuted at 39 on the Billboard Hot 100 alongside the album's 14 other songs; the next week, it dropped to number 91 then fell off the chart. It debuted at 13 on the Rolling Stone Top 100, with 134,000 units sold and 16.2 million streams in its first week. It debuted at number 6 on the Hot Alternative Songs chart, where it spent seven weeks. It achieved success internationally, debuting at 13 on the Canadian Hot 100, 23 on the Billboard Global 200, and 24 on the Australian Top 50 Singles chart.

Credits and personnel 
Credits adapted from Tidal.
 Taylor Swift – vocals, songwriting
 Aaron Dessner – songwriting, production, recording, acoustic guitar, bass, drum machine, electric guitar, piano, synthesizer
 Clarice Jensen – cello
 Nick Lloyd – Hammond B3
 Josh Kaufman – harmonium, lap steel guitar
 Benjamin Lanz – horn arranger, trombone
 Thomas Bartlett – keyboards, synthesizer
 Greg Calbi – mastering
 Steve Fallone – mastering
 Jonathan Low – mixing, recording, vocal engineering
 Yuki Numata Resnick – violin

Charts

Weekly charts

Year-end charts

References 

2020 songs
Song recordings produced by Aaron Dessner
Songs written by Taylor Swift
Taylor Swift songs
Songs written by Aaron Dessner
American folk songs